Hakon Sunnivasson ("from Jutland") was a Danish nobleman and the father of King Eric III of Denmark.

Biography
Hakon was the son of a Danish nobleman. His mother, Sunniva, was the daughter of  a daughter of Norwegian King Magnus the Good. Hakon married Ragnhild, daughter of King Eric I of Denmark. According to Saxo Grammaticus, he had avenged the murder of Eric's brother Bjørn, and he may have served as the king's jarl in the border region. In 1131, he was initially part of the conspiracy against his brother-in-law Canute Lavard, but he withdrew when the plans turned towards murder.  Because he was bound by oath, he could not warn Canute.

References 

Danish people of Norwegian descent
12th-century Danish people
Date of birth unknown
Date of death unknown
Year of birth unknown
Year of death unknown
Medieval Danish nobility